James McPherson may refer to:
 James Alan McPherson (1943–2016), American short story writer and essayist, and winner of the Pulitzer Prize for fiction
 James Alpin McPherson (1842–1895), Australian bushranger
 James B. McPherson (1828–1864), general in the United States Civil War
 James M. McPherson (born 1936), Pulitzer Prize-winning United States history professor and Civil War historian
 James E. McPherson (born 1953), acting United States Secretary of the Navy
 James Unaipon (died 1907), Australian Aboriginal leader (used the surname McPherson prior to 1861)
 James McPherson (cricketer) (1842–1891), Australian cricketer
 James McPherson (football coach) (1891–1960), Scottish football trainer and coach
 James McPherson (New Zealand politician) (1831/32–1905), Member of Parliament in the Waikato Region of New Zealand
 James Anderson McPherson (1900–1980), New Zealand horticulturist, horticultural administrator and writer
 James L. McPherson (1881–1951), member of the Alberta Legislature from 1935 to 1952
 Jim McPherson, former member of the Alberta Legislature from 1982 to 1986

See also
 James Macpherson (disambiguation)